A list of films produced in Turkey in the 2010s:

2010

2017
 Distant Constellation, documentary

References

External links
 Turkish films at the Internet Movie Database

2010s
Turkish
Films